Bieiris de Roman(s) (from Bietris, also Beatriz or Beatritz; English: "Beatrice") was a trobairitz of the first half of the thirteenth century. Her birthplace was Romans near Montélimar.  Other than her name, which includes her place of birth, nothing is known of the details of her life, which has led to a significant gap in knowledge for scholarship analyzing her work.  She left behind one canso, "Na Maria, pretz e fina valors" ("Lady Maria, in your merit and distinction"), addressed to another woman named Mary. The poem is written in the typical troubadour style of courtly love and has been consequently analyzed as a lesbian poem. Bieiris may, however, be simply writing from the masculine point of view, fully immersing herself in the masculinity of the genre. Nonetheless, the certain ascription of the poem to a woman makes it unlikely that there was any attempt to "fool" the audience: the poem is consequently emasculated.  The Na Maria of the poem has even been interpreted as the Virgin Mary, and the sincerity and innocence of the lyrics do not disqualify it.

François Zufferey has argued that Bieiris' composition is in fact a work by Gui d'Ussel. Joining him in ascribing the poem of Bieiris to a man are Oskar Schultz-Gora, Gianfranco Folena, and Elizabeth W. Poe. The early French medievalist Jean-Baptiste de Lacurne de Sainte-Palaye believed it to have been written on behalf of a man. Bieiris' lesbianism, too, has its defenders: Pierre Bec, Magda Bogin, Renat Nelli, and John Boswell. Angelica Rieger, on the other hand, has forcefully defended Bieiris' authorship but denied her lesbianism, saying that modern readers are imposing their biases onto the text. She has sought to show that Bieiris is in fact employing the language of affection popular among noblewomen of the period. Rieger supports her claims by comparing Bieiris' courtly language to that of Azalais de Porcairagues and Carenza. Alison Ganze expands on Rieger's assertion that Bieiris was indeed writing to another woman, but that the canso is consistent with expressions of political loyalty in the feudal system.

The last stanza of her canso reads as follows:

Notes

Sources

Bogin, Magda. The Women Troubadours. W. W. Norton & Company, 1988. .
Bruckner, Matilda Tomaryn; Shepard, Laurie; and White, Sarah. Songs of the Women Troubadours. New York: Garland Publishing, 2000. .
Dronke, Peter. Women Writers of the Middle Ages. Cambridge: Cambridge University Press, 1984.
Ganze, Alison. "'Na Maria, Pretz E Fina Valors': A New Argument for Female Authorship." Romance Notes 49:1 (2009), pp 23-33. 
Harvey, Ruth E. Review of The Voice of the Trobairitz: Perspectives on the Women Troubadours by William D. Paden. In Medium aevum, 59 (1990) pp. 332–333.
Paterson, Linda M. Review of The Voice of the Trobairitz: Perspectives on the Women Troubadours by William D. Paden. In The Modern Language Review, 86:1 (Jan., 1991), p. 198.
Pendle, Karin. Women and Music: A History. Indianapolis: Indiana University Press, 2001. .
Poe, Elizabeth W. Review of The Voice of the Trobairitz: Perspectives on the Women Troubadours by William D. Paden. In Speculum, 67:1 (Jan., 1992), pp. 207–209.
Sankovitch, Tilde. "The trobairitz". The Troubadours: An Introduction. Simon Gaunt and Sarah Kay, edd. Cambridge: Cambridge University Press, 1999. .

13th-century troubadours
Trobairitz
People from Drôme
13th-century women writers
Lesbian literature